Swim Ireland is the national governing body of swimming, diving, water polo, open water swimming and synchronised swimming in the island of Ireland (Republic of Ireland and Northern Ireland). Competitors from Northern Ireland can opt to compete for British Swimming in international competitions, with the exception of the Commonwealth Games where they can compete for Northern Ireland.

Swim Ireland is affiliated with LEN, FINA and the Olympic Council of Ireland.

History 
Swim Ireland emerged in 1998 from the Irish Amateur Swimming Association (IASA), that was dissolved in January 1999 following proven sexual abuse and other scandals involving senior coaches. Swim Ireland assumed IASA abuse victim liabilities.

Domestic competitions 
Swim Ireland runs national meets which include:
Dave McCullagh Memorial (March/April)
Irish Open Championships (April/May)
Irish Age Groups Division 2 (June)
Irish Age Group/Youth Championships (July)
Irish Open SC Championships (July/August)
Irish Open Diving Championships (November)
Irish Age Groups Division 1
Swim Ireland works with the different regions in organising competitions such as provincial Age Group Championships as well as other graded, distance and inter-club meets. They also work with the Irish Schools Swimming Association who run the Irish Minor and Secondary Schools Championships.

The Age Group InterProvincial takes place every year at the beginning of the summer months for swimmers up to the age of 16 years.  This is where teams from the 4 provinces of Ireland (Ulster, Munster, Leinster and Connacht) compete against each other.

These competitions take place in either the National Aquatic Centre, Dublin or at University Arena, Limerick.  Both pools have the compatibility to be changed into 50m and 25m.

In 2003, Swim Ireland hosted the European Short Course Championships at the National Aquatic Centre in Dublin. The event was a resounding success with a world record being broken by the Dutch in the final race, the men's 4x50m Freestyle relay.

Swim Ireland also organise The Liffey Swim which takes place in August to September annually.

Irish swimmers 
Swim Ireland recently introduced a new squad structure.  This begins with Club Level, then Regional Level, National Level and finally the Elite Squad.

See also
List of Olympic-size swimming pools in Ireland
Sport in Ireland
Eddie Heron
Ger Doyle

References

External links 
 
 Map of the swimming pool in Dublin

1998 establishments in Ireland
Ireland
Swimming
Swimming in Ireland
Swimming organizations